Guvacine is an pyridine alkaloid in areca nuts. It is the N-demethylated derivative of arecaidine and the product of ester hydrolysis of guvacoline, both of which are also found in areca nuts as well. It is also an inhibitor of gamma-aminobutyric acid uptake. Lime is said to hydrolyse guvacoline to guvacine.

References

Alkaloids
Carboxylic acids
GABA reuptake inhibitors